Yoruba Santos Numa Lopes Pinto (born 20 May 1985), known as Yoruba Pinto or simply Yoruba, is an Angolan-São Toméan footballer who plays for Portuguese club Lusitano de Évora as a defender. He also holds Portuguese citizenship. He has lived in Portugal since age three.

Born in Angola to an Angolan mother and a São Toméan father and raised in Portugal, in 2015, Yoruba chose to represent the São Tomé and Príncipe football team internationally. He made his national debut on 11 October 2015 in a World Cup qualifier against Ethiopia, coming on as a substitute in the 76th minute.

On a club level, Yoruba started in the youth system of Barreirense before moving to Seixal F.C. In 2003-04, he led all juniors in the county with 19 goals for Seixal. As a senior, he began playing for A.C. Arrentela from 2004 to 2005, before moving back to Seixal. In 2008, he moved again, to G.D. Alfarim, where he remained until 2011. He appeared in 14 matches for his club in the 2010-11 season, scoring three goals. Since then, he bounced around the lower divisions to F.C. Barreirense and Eléctrico F.C. He had the best season of his career in 2013-14, scoring nine goals in 23 matches for Sintrense. This also represented the highest level of football he had competed in, the Campeonato de Portugal. He continued playing in the third division for the 2014-15 season, where he represented Fabril Barreiro and Sintrense. His stint at that level was short-lived, however, as he moved to fourth-division Almada A.C. in 2015, and then to his current team, Alcochetense. Since the start of the 2010-11 season, Yoruba has appeared in 124 games domestically and scored 27 goals.

References

External links 
 
 
 

1985 births
Living people
Association football forwards
People with acquired São Tomé and Príncipe citizenship
São Tomé and Príncipe footballers
São Tomé and Príncipe international footballers
São Tomé and Príncipe people of Angolan descent
Angolan footballers
Footballers from Luanda
Angolan people of São Tomé and Príncipe descent
Angolan emigrants to Portugal
Naturalised citizens of Portugal
Portuguese footballers
Portuguese people of São Tomé and Príncipe descent
Portuguese sportspeople of Angolan descent
F.C. Barreirense players
G.D. Fabril players
S.U. Sintrense players